Udaykrishna–Sibi K. Thomas is an Indian screenwriting duo known for their works in Malayalam cinema. Most of their works are in the comedy genre. They wrote films such as Mattupetti Machan (1998), Udayapuram Sulthan (1999), Dhosth (2001), C.I.D. Moosa (2003), Runway (2004), Kochi Rajavu (2005), Thuruppu Gulan (2006), Twenty:20 (2008), Pokkiri Raja (2010), Christian Brothers (2011) and Mayamohini (2012).

The duo parted in 2015. Udayakrishna continued as a scriptwriter while Sibi K. Thomas became a filmmaker. Udayakrishna's first independent script was Pulimurugan (2016) which became the first Malayalam film to gross over 100 and 150 crore at the box office, the highest-grossing Malayalam film at that time.

Career
Both Siby and Udayakrishna started their careers as assistant directors. Siby assisted Balu Kiriyath and Sandhya Mohan, while Udayakrishna assisted screenwriter A.R.Mukesha and was assistant director under Balu Kiriyath, Ali Akbar, K. Madhu and Venu B. Nair. Manoj K. Jayan prodded them into a partnership and agreed to star in their directorial debut. However, that project did not work out. Subsequently, they wrote their first script, Hitler Brothers (1997), for Sandhya Mohan, followed by Mayajalam for Balu Kiriyath. Both films failed at the box office. The duo's first hit came through Mattuppetti Machan directed by Jose Thomas, followed by Udayapuram Sulthan. Then came Sundrapurushan, which was a moderate success. It was followed by Rajasenan's successful movies, Darling Darling and Malayalimamanu Vanakkam. C.I.D. Moosa, was a success. They associated with Johny Antony in most of his directorial ventures thereafter, including the commercially successful Kochi Rajavu and Thuruppu Gulan.

They worked with veteran director Joshiy in Runway,  Lion and July 4, and in the landmark Malayalam film Twenty:20. Twenty:20 was produced by Association of Malayalam Movie Artists in association with Dileep's Grand Productions and starred most major actors of Malayalam cinema. The film became the highest grossing Malayalam film of all time and brought appreciations for Siby and Udayakrishna. Twenty:20 was followed by Ee Pattanathil Bhootham, which was panned by the critics and an average grosser. In 2010, they made a comeback with Pokkiri Raja, which went on to become a big success and the highest-grossing film of the year. However, critical responses for Pokkiri Raja were mostly mixed. They scripted debutante Thomson K. Thomas's Kaaryasthan. Despite negative reviews from critics, the film closely followed Pokkiri Raja in collection records of the year. Their only film in 2011 was Christian Brothers with Joshiy, which became a success. They scripted two films in 2012, Mayamohini and Mr. Marumakan. The former was a success and was among the highest-grossing films of the year while the latter, despite heavy criticism, became an average hit. The last release in their combination is Ivan Maryadaraman. Later in 2016 Udaykrishna wrote script for Pulimurugan directed by Vysakh which was second highest-grossing Malayalam film of all time.Then he wrote scripts for Masterpiece(2017) directed by Ajai Vasudev	and Aanakkallan(2018) directed by	Suresh Divakar both received mixed reviews but were commercial success. In 2019 he scripted Madhura Raja which was a spin-off to Pokkiri Raja. Even though it received mixed to positive reviews, and it grossed 100 crores from box office. In 2022, he wrote scripts for two Mohanlal starring films Aaraattu directed by B. Unnikrishnan and Monster directed by Vyshakh. Aaraattu received negative reviews and Monster received mixed reviews and both were box-office failures. In 2023, he scripted Christopher directed by B. Unnikrishnan released in theatres and opened to mixed to positive reviews from critics and audiences.

Personal life
Udaykrishnan is married to Manju and has a son. Siby is married to Jisha and has a son and daughter.

Filmography

Udaykrishna–Sibi K. Thomas (as writer duo)

Udaykrishna (as solo writer)

Udaykrishna (as actor)

Udayakrishna Cinematic Universe
  
Ukriverse  is an Indian shared universe centered on a series of action-thriller films created by Udayakrishna. Which feature various fictional undercover agents doing secret operations.

Films

!{{center|Christopher
|
|{{center|Unnikrishnan. B
|{{center|RD Illuminations
|}

Masterpiece (2017 film)
The students of Travancore's Maharaja's College, they form gangs and fight among themselves While a murder takes place and s it leads to crimes and brutal fights, an English professor named Edward Livingstone decides to restore order to the campus and unravels the mystery of the murder.

Aaraattu (2022 film)
To prevent the plot from turning into agricultural land, Edathal Mathai leases it to Gopan. While the natives initially oppose Gopan and his intentions, he eventually wins them over.

Monster (2022 film)
Trying to cope with the hardships, Bhamini and Anil's lives turn catastrophic as Lucky Singh invades. Secrets unveil when the uninvited guest starts his game.

Cast and Characters

References

External links
 
 
 
 

Living people
Indian screenwriting duos
Indian male screenwriters
Malayalam screenwriters
21st-century Indian dramatists and playwrights
Screenwriters from Kerala
20th-century Indian dramatists and playwrights
20th-century Indian male writers
21st-century Indian male writers
Year of birth missing (living people)